St. Thérèse Chapel and Academy is a Traditionalist Catholic church and children's school in Nicholville, New York, operated by the Society of Saint Pius X (SSPX).

The parish community got started in 1986 with SSPX's Father Goettler saying Mass in Lawrence Town Hall.  Education of children by the parish also began immediately.  Once the parish grew to about 50 people, a temporary chapel was established in 1989.  Construction of the academy building also began in October 1989.

The school building was finished in 1992 and opened with 20 students.  In October 1997, the current church began construction, and the first Mass was celebrated in the new building on Christmas Day, 1999.

Today, the school has an enrollment of about 50 students.

Roman Catholic churches in New York (state)
Buildings and structures of the Society of Saint Pius X
Catholic elementary schools in the United States
Churches in St. Lawrence County, New York
Schools in St. Lawrence County, New York